Saint-André-de-Kamouraska is a municipality in the Canadian province of Quebec, located in the Kamouraska Regional County Municipality. Before 2020 it was only known as Saint-André.

Geography

Saint-André-de-Kamouraska is located on the southern shoreline of the Saint Lawrence River along with several islands belonging to the municipality situated offshore to the north.

Communities
The following locations reside within the municipality's boundaries:
Saint-André
Saint-André-Station – a hamlet in the southeast part of the municipality

Lakes and rivers
The following waterways pass through or are situated within the municipality's boundaries:
Rivière des Caps (Mouth:)
Rivière Fouquette (Mouth:)

Municipal council
 Mayor: Gervais Darisse

See also
 Saguenay–St. Lawrence Marine Park
 Île aux Lièvres (Saint Lawrence River)
 List of municipalities in Quebec

References

External links
 

Municipalities in Quebec
Incorporated places in Bas-Saint-Laurent